James Madison Marvin (February 27, 1809 – April 25, 1901) was a businessman and U.S. Representative from New York during the latter half of the American Civil War.

Early life
Marvin was born in Ballston, New York. He was the son of William Marvin and Mary Benedict Marvin, and the brother and later business partner of Thomas J. Marvin, Saratoga County judge and member of the New York State Assembly in 1833. Marvin attended the common schools. He moved to Saratoga Springs, New York in 1828.

Marriage and children
In 1838 he married Rhoby H. Barnum. The couple had five children, a son, William, who died at age nine in 1855, and four daughters, Mary, Frances, Caroline, and Rhobie, who were still living as of 1878

Career
He engaged in the hotel business in Saratoga Springs and Albany, New York. In 1839 he became one of the proprietors of the United States Hotel in Saratoga Springs. He was an employer and friend of Solomon Northup who was kidnapped and forced into slavery in 1841. In 1852, Northup had a letter sent by Samuel Bass explaining his circumstances and the need to have proof of his freedom to be freed.

He was a Whig member of the New York State Assembly (Saratoga Co.) in 1846. He served as a member of the board of supervisors of Saratoga County and served as chairman of the board in 1845, 1857, 1862, and 1874.

In 1859, he was elected to the first board of trustees of the Saratoga Monument Association, charged with building a monument on the site of Burgoyne's 
surrender in 1777.

Marvin was elected as a Republican to the Thirty-eighth, Thirty-ninth, and Fortieth Congresses (March 4, 1863 – March 4, 1869). He served as chairman of the Committee on Expenditures in the Department of the Treasury (Thirty-ninth and Fortieth Congresses). He was not a candidate for renomination.

He founded and served as president of the First National Bank of Saratoga Springs, New York. He served as director of the Schenectady and Saratoga Railroad and of the New York Central Railroad. He died at Saratoga Springs, New York, April 25, 1901, and was interred in Greenridge Cemetery.

References

 Retrieved on 2009-5-12
Bio Sketch

External links

James M. Marvin obituary from the New York Times

1809 births
1901 deaths
People of New York (state) in the American Civil War
Politicians from Saratoga Springs, New York
Burials at Greenridge Cemetery
Republican Party members of the United States House of Representatives from New York (state)
19th-century American politicians